George Howard Rogers (4 April 1905 – 24 February 1958) was an English cricketer.  Rogers was a right-handed batsman.  He was born in Redruth, Cornwall.

Rogers made his debut for Cornwall in the 1924 Minor Counties Championship against Devon.  Rogers played Minor counties cricket for Cornwall from 1924 to 1939, making 86 appearances, before his career was abruptly halted by World War II.

He made his only first-class appearance for the Minor Counties cricket team against Oxford University in 1939.  In the Minor Counties first-innings, he was dismissed for a duck by Algernon Marsham.  In their second-innings, he was dismissed for 8 runs by the same bowler.

He died in Camborne, Cornwall on 24 February 1958.

References

External links
George Rogers at ESPNcricinfo
George Rogers at CricketArchive

1905 births
1958 deaths
People from Redruth
English cricketers
Cornwall cricketers
Minor Counties cricketers